Fr Peter McVerry, SJ (born 1944) is an Irish Roman Catholic priest, notable for battling homelessness in Ireland. According to one report, the trust which he founded helped 3,600 homeless people in Dublin in 2013.

Early years
Born in Belfast in 1944, McVerry grew up in Newry, County Down. He was educated by the Christian Brothers in Abbey Christian Brothers' Grammar School, and later attended Clongowes Wood College. He entered the Society of Jesus in 1962.

He received a BSc in Chemistry (1968) and a Higher Diploma in Education (1969) from University College Dublin in 1968. He studied philosophy and theology in the Jesuit School of Theology in Milltown Park.

Fighting homelessness
After his ordination as a priest in 1975, McVerry lived and worked in Summerhill, North Dublin. During these years he came face to face with the problem of homelessness and deprivation. He set up a trust to help struggling young people. He first worked in Ballymun and the North Inner City during the 1970s when he found young homeless people in the streets.  In 1983, he founded a charity to tackle homelessness called The Arrupe Society after Jesuit leader Pedro Arrupe, but it was subsequently renamed the Peter McVerry Trust, which began as a three-bedroom flat in Ballymun.

The trust grew from one flat over the years, to include eleven homeless hostels, over 100 apartments, a residential drug detox centre and two drug stabilisation services. In 1979, he opened a hostel for young homeless boys aged between twelve and sixteen. He focused on those deemed too difficult to deal with by other agencies. McVerry recently opened a residential drug detox centre in County Dublin for homeless drug users. McVerry has lived in Ballymun since 1980. 

In 2013, the charity worked with almost 3,600 vulnerable youths. There was controversy in 2014 when a candidate for political office used images of McVerry in campaign leaflets, and McVerry denied that he was endorsing any particular candidate. He appealed to the government to buy more housing for the homeless. He advocated greater spending to help reduce inequality. In 2014, he stated that the crisis of homelessness was threatening middle-class and working-class families.

In 2015, Trinity College Dublin awarded him with an honorary doctorate.

In 2015, he was awarded the UCD Alumni Award in Science.

Peter McVerry Trust
The Peter McVerry Trust (known previously as The Arrupe Society) was founded in 1983 as a charity to reduce homelessness in Ireland. The organisation was a continuation of work Fr. McVerry had been doing in Ballymun. The Arrupe Jesuit community in Ballymun involved itself directly with missionary work on the ground in one of Dublin’s poorest districts; working to scaffold community-building among socially disadvantaged people.

References

External links
Father Peter McVerry features on RTE tv in 1990 discussing the inadequacies of facilities for homeless boys in Ballymun

Living people
1944 births
20th-century Irish Jesuits
21st-century Irish Jesuits
People from Newry
Alumni of University College Dublin
Alumni of Milltown Institute of Theology and Philosophy
Date of birth missing (living people)
Faculty of Belvedere College